Carl Weathers (born January 14, 1948) is an American actor and former professional football player. He is known for his roles as boxer Apollo Creed in the first four Rocky films (1976–1985), Al Dillon in Predator (1987), Action Jackson in Action Jackson (1988), and Chubbs Peterson in Happy Gilmore (1996) and in Little Nicky (2000), and Combat Carl in the Toy Story franchise. He also portrayed Det. Beaudreaux in the television series Street Justice (1991–1993) and a fictionalized version of himself in the comedy series Arrested Development (2004, 2013), and voiced Omnitraxus Prime in Star vs. the Forces of Evil (2017–2019). He has a recurring role as Greef Karga in the Star Wars series The Mandalorian (2019–present).

Weathers played college football at San Diego State University. After going undrafted in the 1970 NFL Draft, he signed with the Oakland Raiders. He would sign with the B.C. Lions of the Canadian Football League after being released by the Raiders.

Early life
Weathers was born January 14, 1948, in New Orleans, Louisiana. His father was a day laborer. As an eighth-grade student, he earned an athletic scholarship to St. Augustine High School, a private school. He was an all-around athlete, involved in boxing, football, gymnastics, judo, soccer, and wrestling. He played football and graduated from Long Beach Poly high in 1966.

College football career
Weathers played football as a defensive end in college. He started his college career in 1966 at Long Beach City College, where he did not play in 1966 due to an ankle injury suffered when he tripped over a curb surrounding the running track while warming up for practice with another linebacker. He then transferred and played for San Diego State University, becoming a letterman for the San Diego State Aztecs in 1968 and 1969, helping the Aztecs win the 1969 Pasadena Bowl, finishing with an 11–0 record, and a No. 18 ranking in the Final UPI Poll, playing for head coach Don Coryell. At San Diego, Weathers received a master in theatre arts.

Professional football career

Oakland Raiders
After he went undrafted, Weathers signed with the Oakland Raiders as a free agent in 1970. Now playing as a linebacker, Weathers played in seven games for the Raiders in 1970, helping them win the  AFC West Division title, on their way to the first-ever AFC Championship Game. Weathers only played in one game in 1971, before the Raiders released him.

BC Lions 
He then signed with the BC Lions of the Canadian Football League in 1971 and played until 1973, playing 18 games in total. During the off-seasons, Weathers attended San Francisco State University and earned a bachelor's degree in drama in 1974.

Retirement 
He retired from football in 1974, and began pursuing an acting career. In his NFL career he appeared in 8 games in two seasons, but didn't record any stats. The only stat he recorded in his CFL career was a single fumble recovery.

Other contributions to the NFL 
Weathers narrated NFL Films' season recap of the 1999, 2000 and 2001 seasons. During the 2017 NFL Draft, he appeared on NFL Network's pre-draft coverage.

Acting career
Weathers began working as an extra while still playing football. He had his first significant roles in two blaxploitation films directed by his longtime friend Arthur Marks: Bucktown (1975) and Friday Foster (1975). Weathers also appeared in an early 1975 episode of the sitcom Good Times titled "The Nude", portraying an angry husband who suspected his wife of cheating on him with J.J. He also guest-starred in a 1975 episode of Kung Fu titled "The Brothers Caine", and in an episode of Cannon titled "The Hero". In 1976, he appeared as a loan shark in an episode of the crime-drama Starsky and Hutch, and in the Barnaby Jones episode "The Bounty Hunter" as escaped convict Jack Hopper.

While auditioning for the role of Apollo Creed alongside Sylvester Stallone in Rocky, Weathers criticized Stallone's acting, which led to him getting the role. He reprised the role of Apollo Creed in the next 3 Rocky films: Rocky II (1979), Rocky III (1982), and Rocky IV (1985).

Weathers is briefly seen as an Army MP in one of the three released versions of Close Encounters of the Third Kind (originally released in 1977). In 1978, Weathers portrayed Vince Sullivan in a TV movie, Not This Time. In the late 1970s and 1980s, Weathers starred in a number of action films for the small and big screen, including Force 10 from Navarone (1978), Predator (1987), Action Jackson (1988), and Hurricane Smith (1992). As a member of the cast of Predator, Weathers worked with future California governor Arnold Schwarzenegger and future Minnesota governor Jesse Ventura. Many years later he appeared in a spoof segment on Saturday Night Live,  announcing that he was running for political office and urging viewers to vote for him on the basis that "he was the black guy in Predator.

He also appeared in Michael Jackson's "Liberian Girl" music video and co-starred in the Adam Sandler comedy Happy Gilmore, as Chubbs, a golf legend teaching Happy how to play golf. He reprised the role nearly four years later in the Sandler comedy Little Nicky.

Another notable TV role was Sgt. Adam Beaudreaux on the cop show Street Justice. Afterwards, during the final two seasons of In the Heat of the Night, from 1992-1994, his character, Hampton Forbes, replaced Bill Gillespie as the chief of police. He also played as MACV-SOG Colonel Brewster in the CBS series Tour of Duty.

In 2004, Weathers received a career revival as a comedic actor beginning with appearances in three episodes of the comedy series Arrested Development as a cheapskate caricature of himself, who serves as Tobias Fünke's acting coach. He was then cast in the comedies The Sasquatch Gang and The Comebacks. Weathers had a guest role in two episodes of The Shield as the former training officer of main character Vic Mackey.

Weathers provided the voice for Colonel Samuel Garrett in the Pandemic Studios video game Mercenaries: Playground of Destruction. In 2005, he was a narrator on Conquest! The Price Of Victory - Witness The Journey of the Trojans!, an 18-part television show about USC athletics. Weathers is a principal of Red Tight Media, a film and video production company that specializes in tactical training films made for the United States armed forces. He also appeared in one episode of ER as the father of an injured boxer during their 2008 finale season.

For the sixth film in the Rocky series, Rocky Balboa (2006), Stallone asked Weathers, Mr. T, and Dolph Lundgren for permission to use footage from their appearances in the earlier Rocky films. Mr. T and Lundgren agreed, but Weathers wanted an actual part in the movie, even though his character had died in Rocky IV. Stallone refused, and Weathers decided not to allow Stallone to use his image for flashbacks from the previous films. They instead used footage of a fighter who looks similar to Weathers. Weathers and Stallone patched up their differences and Weathers agreed to allow footage of him from previous films to be used throughout Creed.

Weathers portrayed the father of Michael Strahan and Daryl "Chill" Mitchell's characters on the short-lived 2009 Fox sitcom Brothers. Weathers acted as Brian "Gebo" Fitzgerald in advertising for Old Spice's sponsorship of NASCAR driver Tony Stewart. He also appears in an ongoing series of web-only advertisements for Credit Union of Washington, dispensing flowers and the advice that "change is beautiful" to puzzled-looking bystanders. He is also starring in a series of commercials for Bud Light, in which he introduces plays from the "Bud Light Playbook." At the conclusion of each commercial, Weathers can be seen bursting through the Bud Light Playbook and shouting "Here we go!"

In 2019, Weathers appeared as Greef Karga in several episodes of the first season of the Star Wars series, The Mandalorian. He returned for the second season and also directed the episode "Chapter 12: The Siege". His performance earned him an Emmy nomination for Outstanding Guest Actor.

Personal life
Weathers and his ex-wife, Mary Ann, have two sons.

Filmography

Film

Television

Video games

References

External links

1948 births
Living people
St. Augustine High School (New Orleans) alumni
20th-century American male actors
21st-century American male actors
Male actors from Long Beach, California
African-American players of American football
American male voice actors
Oakland Raiders players
American players of Canadian football
BC Lions players
Canadian football linebackers
Long Beach City Vikings football players
Male actors from New Orleans
Players of American football from New Orleans
Players of American football from Long Beach, California
Players of Canadian football from New Orleans
Players of Canadian football from Long Beach, California
San Diego State Aztecs football players
San Francisco State University alumni
African-American male actors
American male film actors
American male television actors
American television directors
20th-century African-American sportspeople
21st-century African-American people